Manawatū College is a state secondary co-educational high school in Foxton, New Zealand.

House system
Each student belongs to a 'house group'. They compete against each other in an inter-house competition. The house group with the highest number of points at the end of each academic year wins the 'house cup'. Each house also has five 'Mentor Groups' that each student is placed into. The Groups contain a number of students from each year level. Students stay in the same Mentor Group, generally with the same Mentor Teacher, right through their time at Manawatū College.

Floods 2004
In February 2004, the college became a shelter for people evacuated from Moutoa due to flooding.

References

External links
 Official Manawatu College Website

Secondary schools in Manawatū-Whanganui
Foxton, New Zealand